The Amazing Race Norge 1 is the first season of the Norwegian reality television series The Amazing Race Norge.

The show is presented by football-player Freddy dos Santos and was produced by TV 2 and the television production company Rubicon TV.

It premiered on 11 April 2012 at 20:00 (CEST) and aired twice a week, every Monday and Wednesday. The finale aired on 30 May 2012 at 21:40 (CEST), with a special Highlights episode on 3 June.

Brothers Morten and Truls Bjerke from Bodø were the winners of this season.

Production

Development and filming

TV 2 greenlit the first season of the series in October 2011. Filming for this season started on 9 January 2012.

This season used various colours for route markers; yellow and red, yellow and white, and yellow and green, whereas in the original version, a single colour scheme is used.

The non-elimination penalty was called a Handicap (Handikap). It affects teams by making a certain task in the next leg harder for the team or by giving a penalty. For example, in the second leg, Martha & Elise had to make 75 dung cakes instead of 50 and make a higher stack of dried dung cakes than the other teams in order to receive their next clue. In Leg 10, the team was required to do both Detours.

This season was the first international spin-off (and second edition to date) in which the location of the Starting Line was also the location of the Finish Line: Holmenkollbakken. The other edition to do so was the ninth season of the original version.

Casting
Applications were accepted from 11 October 2011 and ended on 31 October 2011.

Broadcasting
Episodes 11–13 switched from the show's regular scheduled air dates and times slots for a football championship.

Marketing
The season's sponsors include Hotels.com, Nordea, Proffice, and Subaru.

The Team's Video Blogs
Each team were given a video camera before the competition. Teams could record a video diary during their free time, travels between destinations, or record reflections about the leg, or even events after checking into the Pit Stop.

Cast

Results
The following teams will be participating in the season, with their relationships at the time of filming. Note that this table is not necessarily reflective of all content broadcast on television due to inclusion or exclusion of some data. Placements are listed in finishing order:

Key
A  team placement indicates that the team was eliminated.
An  team placement indicates that the team came in last on a non-elimination leg and were penalised with a Handicap (Handikap) in the next leg.
A  indicates that the team decided to use the Express Pass on that leg.
Notes

 Kenneth & Hakan were the last team to complete the task at the Oslo Airport and were eliminated as per the provisions of Leg 1's rules (see below).
 Kari & Bjørn initially arrived 4th, but were issued a 1-hour penalty for not travelling in an Abra boat from Dubai's Creek to the Gold Souk as the clue has specified. Five teams checked in during the penalty time dropping them to 9th place.
 Pål Christian & Ivar were issued a 4-hour penalty for quitting the Roadblock. Already in last place, they were allowed to check in at the Pit Stop and were eliminated without the 4-hour penalty being issued.
 Cathrine & Michelle elected to use the Express Pass to bypass the additional task at the theatre in Leg 4.
 Cathrine & Michelle initially arrived 1st, but were issued a 1-hour penalty for knocking over and picking through the thinner side of the ice block instead of it being left upright at the Roadblock. Karim & Khabat and Morten & Truls checked-in during the penalty time, dropping Cathrine & Michelle to 3rd place.
 Kari & Bjørn were issued a 4-hour penalty for quitting the Handicap. Already in last place, they were allowed to check in at the Pit Stop and were eliminated without the 4-hour penalty being issued.
 Frank & Ivar arrived last at the Green Bazaar after it closed and were unable to buy the ingredients for their final task. Instead, they were instructed to wait for Cathrine & Michelle to finish the task then go directly to the Pit Stop to be eliminated.

Prizes
Individual prizes were awarded to the first team to complete certain legs. Gift certificates were provided by Hotels.com. The prizes were:

Leg 3 – The Express Pass (Fripass) – an item that can be used to skip any one task of the team's choosing up until the 8th leg. If a team gets eliminated without using their Express Pass, the winner of the last leg gets the Express Pass.
Leg 4 –  gift certificate
Leg 7 –  gift certificate
Leg 8 –  gift certificate
Leg 10 –  gift certificate
Leg 11 –  gift certificate
Leg 12 –  gift certificate 
Leg 13 –  from Nordea and a Subaru XV for each team member.

Race summary

Leg 1 (Norway → United Arab Emirates)
Airdate: 11 April 2012

Oslo, Norway (Holmenkollbakken) (Starting Line)
Ullensaker, Akershus (Oslo Airport, Gardermoen) (Elimination Point)
 Oslo (Oslo Airport, Gardermoen) to Dubai, United Arab Emirates (Dubai International Airport)
Dubai (Camel Reproduction Centre)
Palm Jumeirah (Atlantis The Palm – Aquarium) 
Palm Jumeirah (Atlantis The Palm – Aquaventure (Leap of Faith))
 (Palm Jumeirah Monorail) Palm Jumeirah (Atlantis Aquaventure) to Dubai (Gateway Station)
Dubai (Dubai Creek)
Dubai (Dubai Gold Souk)
 Dubai (Al Nafis Jewellers, Mandavi Jewellery, and Sona Jewellery or Dubai Harbour)
Dubai (Burj Khalifa – Top Entrance)
Dubai (Burj Park) 

In this series' first Roadblock, one team member had to wear a wetsuit and retrieve their next clue in a shark tank at the Atlantis, The Palm.

This series' first Detour was a choice between Karat (Carat) or Bære Smart (Smart Carry). In Karat, teams had to make their way to Al Nafis Jewellers, where they would receive a small bag with an address written on it in Arabic. After arriving at the provided address (Mandavi Jewellery), teams would receive another bag with their next address. After delivering this bag to Sona Jewellery, they would receive their next clue. In Bære Smart, teams had to find a boat going from Dubai to Iran in the Dubai harbour and load ten large bags onto the boat to receive their next clue.

Additional tasks
At Holmenkollbakken, teams had to relate three phrases written in different languages (Russian, Arabic and Chinese) with the flags of the countries where they are spoken (Russia, United Arab Emirates and China). Then teams had to show the board to the presenter; if correct they would receive their next clue.
At the Oslo Airport, teams had to search for one of only ten clues located in four different areas of the airport (Information Desk, Lost Property, the Café, and the Passengers Assistance). Each area had a limited number of clues, so if the teams asked for a clue in an area without clues they would have to go to the next area. The last team without a clue would not be given tickets to Dubai and was eliminated.
At the Dubai International Airport, teams had to search for a camel owner named "Hassan". Once the team found Hassan, they would be driven to their next destination: the Camel Breeding Centre.
At the Camel Reproduction Centre, one team member had to ride a camel, while their partner guided it through a course, to receive their next clue.
At Aquaventure, teams had to slide down the Leap of Faith water slide, which dropped them six stories down a nearly 90° incline and through a tunnel beneath the aquarium's shark lagoon, to receive their next clue from the lifeguard.
At the Dubai Creek, teams had to travel in an abra to the Dubai Gold Souk, where they would find their next clue.

Leg 2 (United Arab Emirates → India)

Airdate: 16 April 2012
 Dubai (Dubai International Airport) to Delhi, India (Indira Gandhi International Airport)
 Delhi (Sarai Kale Khan Inter-State Bus Terminus) to Agra, Uttar Pradesh (Idgah Bus Stand)
Agra (Agra Fort)
Agra (Katara Medical Store)
 Agra (Jain Carpet Industries and Diamond Carpets or J.K Cottage Industries)
Agra (Kachpura Village) 
 Agra (Mehtab Bagh overlooking the Taj Mahal) 

This leg's Detour was a choice between Ull (Wool) or Stein (Stone). In Ull, teams had to make their way to Jain Carpet Industries and deliver 50 kilograms of coloured wool to Diamond Carpets to receive their next clue. In Stein, teams had to make their way to J.K Cottage Industries and use a special wetgrinder to grind a small mosaic tile so that it fits in the middle of a stone circle to receive their next clue.

In this leg's Roadblock, one team member had to complete a 120-piece jigsaw puzzle of the Taj Mahal. Once complete, teams could run to the Pit Stop.

Additional tasks
At Agra Fort, teams had to search for three kings, who would give them a puzzle piece, located in different areas of the fort. When teams had the three puzzle pieces, they had to decipher the message: Shah Jehan's wife is next to the black throne. Then teams had to search for the woman who would give them their next clue.
From Agra Fort, teams had to travel in a horse-drawn carriage called a tanga to the Katara Medical Store to find their next clue.
At the Kachpura Village, teams had to make 50 dung cakes and stack 200 dried dung cakes into a pile. For being Handicapped, Martha & Elise had to make 75 dung cakes and stack 300 of them into a pile.

Leg 3 (India)

Airdate: 18 April 2012
Rajasthan (Popliya Ky Dhany)
Amer (Panna Meena ka Kund) 
Jaipur (Ramdulari Pandey ki Printing Factory)
Jaipur (Red Elephant Temple) 
Jaipur (House No. 7)
Jaipur (Nahargarh Fort) 

In this leg's Roadblock, one team member had to search among scattered boxes at the Paana Meena Stepwell for a gem which they could exchange for their next clue.

The leg's Detour was a choice between Langsomt og Vond (Slow and Painful) or Kort og Brutalt (Short and Brutal). In Langsomt og Vond, teams had to lie on a bed of nails. In Kort og Brutalt, teams had to walk across a bed of hot charcoals on fire. After either task, teams would receive a blessing from the priest before being given their next clue.

Additional tasks
On the way to Jaipur, teams had to stop by a roadside village, Popliya Ky Dhany, where they had to make two pieces of an Indian flatbread called chapati to receive their next clue.
At the Ramdulari Pandey ki Printing Factory, teams had to use textile printing that would reveal their next destination. First they had to print a design on the textile, after that, they had to print messages (disguised in a Devanagari-like script), over the design which would instruct them to find the colouring-man who will give them a textile cloth with their next destination printed on it.
At House No. 7, teams had to crush chili to receive their next clue.

Leg 4 (India → Thailand)

Airdate: 23 April 2012
 Jaipur (Jaipur International Airport) to Bangkok, Thailand (Suvarnabhumi Airport)
Bangkok (Floating Market)
Bangkok (Aksra Theatre)
 Bangkok (Nang Loeng Market or Kickboxing Arena)
Bangkok (Tha Maharatch) 
Bangkok (Democracy Monument)
Bangkok (Wat Saket – Golden Mount) 

This leg's Detour was a choice between Dandere (Scattered) or Maltraktere (Mangled). In Dandere, teams had to go to the Nang Loeng Market and make a Thai garland called a phuang malai to receive their next clue. In Maltraktere, teams had to break a piece of bamboo using Muay Thai to receive their next clue.

In this leg's Roadblock, one team member had to pick their way through a block of ice to get their next clue.

Additional tasks
At the floating market, teams had to purchase  each of dragon fruits, guavas, longans, monkey-apples, and star fruits to receive their next clue.
At the Aksra Theatre, teams had to learn to control a puppet in a play to receive their next clue.
At the Democracy Monument, teams had to count the number of cannons (75) surrounding the perimeter to receive their next clue.

Leg 5 (Thailand → Vietnam)

Airdate: 25 April 2012
 Bangkok (Suvarnabhumi Airport) to Hanoi, Vietnam (Noi Bai International Airport)
Hanoi (Điện Biên Phủ Road – Lenin Statue)
Hanoi (Hỏa Lò Prison)
 Hanoi (Bến xe Yên Nghĩa Bus Station) to Phố Vác
Phố Vác (Church) 
 Hanoi (Lệ Mật – Quốc Triệu Restaurant)
Hanoi (Flag Tower of Hanoi)  

This leg's Detour was a choice between Bure Fugl (Birdcage) or Plukke Fugl (Pluck Birds). In Bure Fugl, teams had to make one of a local handicraft of the village, birdcages, before receiving their next clue. In Plukke Fugl, teams had to boil and pluck four chickens before they receive their next clue.

In this leg's Roadblock, one team member had to prepare and then consume snake wine, made from the snake's blood and bile, and then the snake itself to receive their next clue.

Additional tasks
Upon arrival in Vietnam, teams had to locate a statue of Vladimir Lenin on Điện Biên Phủ Road. There, they had to find "Lenin" and give him a coin in exchange for a clue with a photograph of American Senator John McCain in a flight suit. Using the photograph, teams had to figure out the location of the flight suit: Hỏa Lò Prison, infamously known as the "Hanoi Hilton".
At the Flag Tower of Hanoi, teams had to solve a large five-piece version of the Tower of Hanoi puzzle before checking into the Pit Stop. For being Handicapped, Bjarne and Vilde had to solve a six-piece version of the puzzle.

Leg 6 (Vietnam)

Airdate: 30 April 2012
 Hanoi (Camel Bus) to Huế
Huế (Tomb of Tự Đức)
Hương Trà (Tomb of Minh Mạng) 
Hương Thủy (Tomb of Khải Định)
 Huế (Canh Dong Dali or Trung Tâm Giáo Dục Thường Xuyên Phú Yên)
 Huế (Quoc Hoc High School to Huế Citadel – Forbidden City) 

In this leg's Roadblock, one team member had to observe an example of a traditional Vietnamese bouquet, then search around the tomb for many flower girls who each had different flowers. They needed to return with exactly the same flowers, as well as the correct amount, and create a perfect replica of the bouquet to receive their next clue.

This leg's Detour was a choice between På Jordet (In the Ground) or På Bordet (On the Table). In På Jordet, teams had to guide a carabao around a muddy course to receive their next clue. In På Bordet, teams had to travel to Trung Tâm Giáo Dục Thường Xuyên Phú Yên and learn how to properly make 50 sticks of Vietnamese incense to receive their next clue.

Additional tasks
At the Tomb of Tự Đức, teams had to search the massive complex for Tự Đức's grave, where they would find their clues nearby, hanging out of reach, and had to figure out how to get them down.
At the Tomb of Khải Định, teams had to present the bouquet they made in the Roadblock to get their next clue.
At Quoc Hoc High School, teams received a 30-minute massage before receiving their next clue.
After the massage, one team member had to pedal a cyclo carrying their partner to the Pit Stop.

Leg 7 (Vietnam → Australia)

Airdate: 2 May 2012
Da Nang (Marble Mountains – Vân Thông Cave)
 Da Nang (Da Nang International Airport) to Sydney, New South Wales, Australia (Sydney Airport)
Sydney (Port Botany – Port Botany Seaport)
 Sydney (Coogee Beach)
 Sydney (Coogee – Dunningham Reserve)
 Sydney (Rushcutters Bay Marina – EastSail) to Sydney Harbour (Fort Denison) 

This leg's Detour was a choice between Ball or Bikini. For both tasks, teams had to travel to Coogee Beach. In Ball, teams had to play a game of beach volleyball and score seven points to receive their next clue. In Bikini, teams had to look for a woman wearing a bikini with an Australian flag, "the Aussie in a Cossie", who would give them their next clue.

In this leg's Roadblock, one team member had to learn Australian slang from the Aussie on a bench (G'day mate! You look like a stunned mullet! I'm as dry as a dead dingo's donger. Have a go, ya mug!). If they had successfully repeated what they learned to a man nearby, they would receive their next clue.

Additional tasks
At the Marble Mountains, teams had to search among the different caves for the one containing the next clue box, Vân Thông.
At Port Botany, each team member had to construct a wooden pallet. Unbeknownst to them, after constructing the pallets, each team member had to eat a slice of a Vegemite sandwich.
From EastSail, each team had to navigate and steer a sailboat to Fort Denison.
At Fort Denison, teams had to learn three different kinds of knots. After successfully learning the knots, they could run to the Pit Stop.

Leg 8 (Australia)

Airdate: 7 May 2012
Sydney (Sydney Harbour Bridge) (Pit Start)
Sydney (Bondi Beach)
Blue Mountains (Queens Road)
 Blue Mountains National Park (Clearing)
Blue Mountains National Park (Minni-Ha-Ha Falls)
Wollondilly Shire (Braeside Road)
 Wollondilly Shire (Kings Tableland)
Blue Mountains National Park (Boomerang Area)
Blue Mountains National Park (Pulpit Rock Lookout)  

In this leg's Roadblock, one team member had to transfer two snakes from one box to another box to receive their next clue.

This leg's Detour was a choice between Kort Opp (Slow Up) or Langt Ned (Far Down). In Kort Opp, teams had to rock climb a  cliff to receive their next clue. In Langt Ned, teams had to abseil down a higher cliff to receive their next clue.

Additional tasks
At Bondi Beach, teams had to participate in a lifeguard relay. First, one team member had to paddle a surfboard out to a white marker, return to shore, and run up a ramp some distance away and back before tagging his or her teammate, who would then do the same relay before receiving their next clue.
At Minni-Ha-Ha Falls, teams would find a piece of artwork featuring a snake and had to find the two pieces of the picture that were missing. Behind the waterfall were various boards containing many small pieces, only two of which fit properly into the artwork. The missing pieces were different for each team, and teams were only allowed to bring back two pieces at once. When the picture was complete, teams would receive their next clue.
At the boomerang area, both team members had to throw a boomerang so that it would land back into the circle they were in to receive their next clue.
For being Handicapped, Tor Einar & Cathrine had to take a different path toward the Pit Stop to find and retrieve a tiny stuffed toy koala clipped to a metal pole by the presenter. They then had to return it to the presenter at the Pit Stop before they could check in.

Leg 9 (Australia)

Airdate: 9 May 2012
Yarra Valley, Victoria (Maroondah Reservoir) (Pit Start)
 Yering (Lilydale Airport – Melbourne SkyDive Centre)
Coldstream (Rochford Winery)
Melbourne (City Centre – ACDC Lane)
Melbourne (City Centre – Old Melbourne Gaol)
 Melbourne (Hawthorn – Scotch College or North Melbourne – Aegis Park)
Melbourne (Southbank – Eureka Tower)
Melbourne (Southbank – Eureka Tower (Skydeck 88)) 

In this leg's Roadblock, one team member had to sky dive into the Rochford Winery to reunite with his or her partner and receive their next clue.

This leg's Detour was a choice between Liten Ball (Small Ball) or Stor Ball (Big Ball). In Liten Ball, teams had to go to Scotch College and play a game of tennis and score two points to receive their next clue. In Stor Ball, teams had to go to Aegis Park and score 3 goals in an Australian rules football course after getting bumped and tackled by a row of players to receive their next clue.

Additional tasks
At the Rochford Winery, teams had to roll barrels across the vineyard, stack them and serve bottles of wine and food at the Rochford Restaurant to receive their next clue.
At ACDC Lane, teams had to find a painting of The Scream hidden amongst the graffiti. They were instructed to trade it with an art handler, but were immediately "arrested". They were taken to court where they were "charged" for "stealing the painting" and were then locked up in the Old Melbourne Gaol. In their jail cell, they found a roll of paper with a riddle on it ("The prison guard would shout out twelve, the prisoner responded with 6 and was set free. The prison guard would then shout out six and the prisoner responded with 3 and was set free. The prison guard then shouted out ten and the next prisoner shouted out 5 and was hung" – what should the prisoner have shouted?). If they managed to solve the riddle (3), teams were set free and received their next clue. If they could not solve it, teams had to wait an hour before being set free.
Outside the Eureka Tower, teams received a clue instructing them to climb all the way to the next Pit Stop on the 88th floor.

Leg 10 (Australia → Hong Kong)

Airdate: 14 May 2012
 Melbourne (Melbourne Airport) to Chek Lap Kok, Hong Kong, China (Hong Kong International Airport)
Wan Chai District (Golden Bauhinia Square) 
 Central and Western District (Hong Kong Park) 
 (Citybus) Central and Western District (Admiralty MTR Station) to Southern District (Ocean Park Hong Kong)
Southern District (Ocean Park Hong Kong – Panda Observatory)
Southern District (Stanley Market – Stanley Main Street)
Southern District (Stanley Main Beach)
Wan Chai District (Times Square)
Yau Tsim Mong District (Avenue of Stars – Statue of Bruce Lee)
 Yau Tsim Mong District (Chinese Traditional Kung Fu Association)
Yau Tsim Mong District (Tsim Sha Tsui Promenade) 

This leg's Detour was a choice between Rask Ball (Fast Ball) or Rask Mat (Fast Food). In Rask Ball, teams had to go to the Sports Centre of the park and score 10 points in a game of table tennis against a kid. In Rask Mat, teams had to go to the Olympic square of the park where both team member had to finish their plates of dim sum faster against a competitor. For being Handicapped, Kari & Bjørn had to do both Detour choices, one after the other.

In this leg's Roadblock, one team member had to chop wooden planks using kung fu moves to receive their next clue.

Additional tasks
At Ocean Park Hong Kong, teams had to find their next clue box which was located inside the Panda Observatory #2.
At the Stanley Market, teams had to build a pyramid-puzzle from a sample they could only look from afar.
At Stanley's Beach, teams had to paddle a dragon boat in a race around a marked course.
At Times Square, teams had to find a poster featuring the presenter posing for a typical Kung Fu action film, directing them to "Find Bruce Lee at the Avenue of Stars".

Leg 11 (Hong Kong → Macau)

Airdate: 21 May 2012
 Central and Western District (Hong Kong–Macau Ferry Terminal) to Freguesia da Sé, Macau (Outer Harbour Ferry Terminal)
Freguesia da Sé (Macau Tower – Observation Deck)
Freguesia da Sé (Macau Tower – Skywalk X) 
 Freguesia de Santo António (Ruins of Saint Paul's) or Freguesia da Sé (Senado Square)
Freguesia da Sé (Senado Square)
Freguesia da Sé (Senado Square – Restaurant)
Freguesia de São Francisco Xavier (A-Ma Cultural Village) 
Freguesia de São Francisco Xavier (A-Ma Statue) 

In this leg's Roadblock, one team member had to SkyJump  from the Macau Tower to receive their next clue.

This leg's Detour was a choice between Pensler (Brushes) or Pinner (Sticks). In Pensler, teams had to travel to the Ruins of St. Paul where they had to learn to write "The Amazing Race" in Chinese characters using a brush. In Pinner, teams had to travel to the Senado Square where they had to transfer noodles, beans, and tofu to new plates using chopsticks.

Additional tasks
At the Macau Tower's Skywalk X, teams had to retrieve their next clue dangling in the air.
At Senado Square, teams had to count the number of Chinese lanterns hanging in the area (157), before receiving their next clue
At a restaurant in Senado Square, teams had to put back together a cut up roast pig.
At the A-Ma Cultural Village, teams had to make several Portuguese egg tarts called Pastéis de Nata, before receiving their next clue.
To check into the Pit Stop at the A-Ma Statue, teams had to light and bring a candle from the A-Ma Cultural Village without the flame getting snuffed out. If the flame snuffed out, teams would have to go back to the village and re-light the candle. For being Handicapped, Kari & Bjørn had to bring two candles instead of one.

Leg 12 (Macau → Kazakhstan)
Airdate: 28 May 2012

 Freguesia da Sé (Outer Harbour Ferry Terminal) to Central and Western District, Hong Kong (Hong Kong – Macau Ferry Terminal)
 Chep Lap Kok (Hong Kong International Airport) to Almaty, Kazakhstan (Almaty International Airport)
Almaty (Rakhat Chocolate Factory)
Almaty (Almaty Sports Centre) 
Almaty (Kók Tóbe Park – The Beatles Statue) 
Almaty (Luxor Hall)
Almaty (Chimbulak Ski Resort)
Almaty (Green Bazaar)
Almaty (Panfilov Park) 

This season's final Detour was a choice between Hoppe 300 Meter (Jump 300 Metres) or Løfte 10 000 kg (Lift 10,000 kg). In Løfte 10 000 kg, teams had to lift a cumulative total of 10 tonnes in a deadlift exercise to receive their next clue.

In this leg's Roadblock, one team member had to search for their next clue hanging among envelopes marked "The Amazing Fake Norge" on several trees while having snowballs thrown at them.

Additional tasks
At the start of the leg, teams were given a chocolate bar and were told to travel to where it was made to find their next clue.
At the Rakhat Chocolate Factory, teams had to find the next clue hidden inside the wrapper of among 1,500 pieces of chocolate. They had to eat every chocolate they opened while looking for the clue.
At Luxor Hall, teams had to throw 15 curling stones into a goal to get their next clue.
At Chimbulak Ski Resort, teams had to perform a rescue on the slopes before receiving their next clue.
At the Green Bazar, teams had to buy foods that were used in local dishes and had to eat them after the dish was made.

Leg 13 (Kazakhstan → Norway)

Airdate: 30 May 2012
 Almaty (Almaty International Airport) to Oslo, Norway (Oslo Airport, Gardermoen)
Oslo (Oslo City)
Oslo (TV 2 Studios)
Oslo (Suburbs)
 Oslo (Holmenkollen National Arena) 
Oslo (Holmenkollbakken) 

In this season's final Roadblock, located at Holmenkollen National Arena, one team member had to do a winter biathlon. First they had to ski 1 km in a lap, then they had to do rifle shooting and hit 5 targets. If the team misses a target, they would have to ski 150 metres for each miss. After doing two rounds, teams would receive their next clue.

Additional tasks
At Oslo City, teams had to look for a sign with two weather forecasters that would instruct them to go look for them at TV 2's studios.
At the TV 2 Studios, teams had to correctly give out a weather forecast in which one team member would read out a forecast while his/her team member pointed out the cities mentioned on a weather map. If teams incorrectly identify any of the cities, they would be given a map and would have to locate these cities before starting over.
After visiting the TV 2 Studios, teams had to deliver wood to three addresses and assemble an IKEA shelf at the last one to receive their next clue.
At the top of the Holmenkollbakken, teams had to arrange photographs of different items found on previous legs in chronological order. The first team to finish would ride a zip line down to the Finish Line.

References

External links
  
 

Norge 1
2012 Norwegian television seasons
Television shows filmed in Norway
Television shows filmed in the United Arab Emirates
Television shows filmed in India
Television shows filmed in Thailand
Television shows filmed in Vietnam
Television shows filmed in Australia
Television shows filmed in Hong Kong
Television shows filmed in Macau
Television shows filmed in Kazakhstan

no:The Amazing Race Norge